Adolph Klauber (29 April 1879 − 7 December 1933) was an American drama critic and theatrical producer. He was born in Louisville, Kentucky to Edward and Caroline Brahms Klauber. He left Louisville after high school to attend the University of Virginia, after which he moved to New York and took a position with the Empire Theatre Company. In 1900 he began working as a reporter for the New York Commercial Advertiser. From there he moved to the New York Tribune, and thence to the New York Times, where he became drama critic in 1906, a post he held for twelve years. It was during this time that he married the actress and playwright Jane Cowl  He then began working with Archibald and Edgar Selwyn, two of the founders of Goldwyn Pictures, later to become part of MGM, and worked for a while there as a casting director.

Productions
He later became a producer; the list of plays he produced includes:
 1919: Nighty Night
 1920: Scrambled Wives; The Emperor Jones; and Diff'rent
 1921: Like a King
 1922: The Charlatan
With Jane Cowl he also worked on the following productions:
 1923: Lilac Time; and Smilin' Through
With the Selwyns he produced:
 1923: Romeo and Juliet; and Pelléas and Mélisande
 1924: Antony and Cleopatra
 1925: The Depths
 1928: Diversion

Death
He died on 7 December 1933 in Louisville, Kentucky.

Footnotes

1879 births
1933 deaths
American theatre managers and producers
Writers from Louisville, Kentucky